The Alberta-British Columbia Senior League is a defunct senior men's ice hockey league that operated for the 1941–42 season.

History
The West Kootenay League was a senior level hockey league that operated from 1922 to 1923 through 1940–41; and the Alberta Senior Hockey League was a senior level league that operated between 1936 and 1941. Both leagues suspended their operations after the 1940–41 season due to World War II.

For the 1941–42 season, four teams from the two leagues (along with the upstart Red Deer Buffalos), merged to form the Alberta-British Columbia Senior League. Due to the pressures of the war, the league lasted just one season.

The West Kootenay League was resurrected for the 1945–46 season, and in 1946-47 the league expanded into the United States to become the Western International Hockey League.

1941-42 season

Standings

Coaches
 Marty Burke (Calgary Stampeders) 
 Riley "Moon" Mullen (Lethbridge Maple Leafs)
 Ken Campbell (Kimberley Dynamiters)
 Roy Bentley (Trail Smoke Eaters)
 Frank Coulson (Red Deer Buffalos)

Playoffs

Semi finals
In the "Best of 5" semi-final series the Calgary Stampeders beat Trail Smoke Eaters 3 wins to none.
Game 1: Calgary 8 Trail 3
Game 2: Calgary 3 Trail 2
Game 3: Calgary 5 Trail 1

In the "Best of 5" semi-final series Lethbridge Maple Leafs beat Kimberley Dynamiters 3 wins to none, 1 tie.
Game 1: Lethbridge 2 Kimberley 2
Game 2: Lethbridge 4 Kimberley 2
Game 3: Lethbridge 4 Kimberley 1
Game 4: Kimberley defaulted.
Note: Kimberley defaulted so that it could play in the 1941-42 British Columbia Senior Playoffs, which it did over Alberta's objections.

Final
In the final series Lethbridge Maple Leafs beat the Calgary Stampeders 3 wins to 2, 1 tie. The Lethbridge Maple Leafs advanced to the 1941-42 Western Canada Allan Cup Playoffs.
Game 1: Calgary 2 Lethbridge 1
Game 2: Lethbridge 7 Calgary 6
Game 3: Calgary 4 Lethbridge 2
Game 4: Lethbridge 2 Calgary 1
Game 5: Calgary 2 Lethbridge 2
Game 6: Lethbridge 2 Calgary 1

References

External links
http://www.hockeydb.com/ihdb/stats/leagues/6.html
http://www.hockeydb.com/ihdb/stats/leagues/seasons/abcsl19421942.html

Defunct ice hockey leagues in British Columbia
Defunct ice hockey leagues in Alberta
1941 establishments in Canada
1942 establishments in Canada
Sports leagues established in 1941
Sports leagues disestablished in 1942